George Joseph (born 4 August 1938) is an Indian space scientist, best known for his contributions to the development of remote sensing technology in India, especially in the field of earth observation sensors. He is a former chairman of the Lunar Mission Study Task Force of the Indian Space Research Organization and an elected fellow of the National Academy of Sciences, India, Indian Academy of Sciences and Indian National Academy of Engineering. The Government of India awarded him the Padma Bhushan, the third highest civilian award, in 1999.

Early life

George Joseph was born on 4 August 1938 to Advocate MG Joseph and Alice. After completing schooling, he joined St.Berchmans College, Changanassery and also studied at Alagappa Chettiar College in Karaikudi and University College, Trivandrum. He served as lecturer at Union Christian College, Aluva and at CMS College Kottayam. Afterwards he was a trainee at Bhabha Atomic Research Center (BARC), Bombay.

Joseph is married to Mercy and they have two sons Joseph (Gibu) and Mathews (Reji).

Research career

Joseph started his research career in 1962 at the Tata Institute of Fundamental Research in Bombay, where he was involved in the study of cosmic rays. Based on his research work at the Tata Institute he was awarded a PhD degree by the Bombay University.  A novel detector system designed by him was flown on the first Indian satellite Aryabhata (satellite) to detect solar neutrons.

Contributions to the Indian space programme

In 1973, Joseph was invited to join the Space Applications Centre, Ahmedabad-one of the centers of the Indian Space Research Organization, and initiated the development of remote sensing technology particularly sensors of various types. He has been the guiding force in the design and development of all the earth observation cameras on board Indian Remote Sensing Satellite and INSAT.  He served the Indian Space Research Organization in various capacities including director of its Space Applications Centre and took keen interest and initiative to ensure the fruits of space technology reach common man.  One of his contributions is the study report on Indian Mission to the Moon in the capacity as chairman of the Lunar Mission Study Task Force.

Joseph has served in a number of national and international committees/organizations including president of Technical Commission – I of the International Society for Photogrammetry and Remote Sensing during 1996–2000 and director of the Centre for Space Science and Technology Education in Asia and the Pacific (affiliated to the United Nations), with headquarters at Dehradun during 2006–2009.

Positions held 
 2010-2018: Honorary Distinguished Professor, Indian Space Research Organization
 2006-2009: Director, Centre for Space Science and Technology Education in Asia and the Pacific
 2003-2006: Honorary Distinguished Professor, Indian Space Research Organization
 1998-2003: Satish Dhawan Distinguished Professor
 1994-1998: Director, Space Applications Centre, Ahmedabad
 1990-1994: Associate Director, Space Applications Centre, Ahmedabad
 1985-1994: Dy. Director (Remote Sensing), Space Applications Centre, Ahmedabad
 1975-1985: Head, Sensor Development Division, Space Applications Centre, Ahmedabad
 1973-1975: Scientist/Engineer, Remote Sensing & Meteorology Applications Division, Space Applications Centre, Ahmedabad
 1970-1973: Fellow, Tata Institute of Fundamental Research, Bombay
 1962-1970: Research Associate, Tata Institute of Fundamental Research, Bombay
 1961-1962: Trainee (Physics), Atomic Energy Establishment School
 1959-1961: Lecturer in Physics, Union Christian College, Alwaye (Affiliated with the University of Kerala)

Special Responsibilities/Assignments (International /National) 
 2010-2020 : Editor-in-Chief Journal of the Indian Society of Remote Sensing
2012: Member Scientific Advisory Committee, Indian Institute of Astrophysics, Bangalore
 2010: Chairman Review panel of the Tata Institute of Fundamental Research Balloon Facility
 2010: Member, State Council of Climate Change, Govt of Himachal Pradesh
 2004–2006: Member, Governing Council, Indian National Centre for Ocean Information Services, Hyderabad
 2003–2004: Member of the International Academy of Astronautics Study Team on `Space to promote peace –initial focus on reconstruction of Afghanistan
 2002–2004: President, Indian Society of Remote Sensing
 1999–2001: President, Gujarat Science Academy
 1999 : Consulting Faculty, Taleem Research Foundation, Ahmedabad
 1997–1998: Member, Steering Committee, Centre for Development of Advanced Computing, Pune
 1997–2000: Member, Research Council, National Institute of Oceanography
 1996–2000: President, Technical Commission-I, International Society for Photogrammetry and Remote Sensing
 1996–1999: President, Indian Society of Geomatics
 1994–1997: Member, Research Council, Central Glass and Ceramic Research Institute, Calcutta
 1994–1996: President, Indian Society of Remote Sensing
 1993–1996: Vice-President, Indian Society of Geomatics
 1993–1996: Member, Management Council, Vikram Sarabhai Centre for Development Interaction
 1992–1998: Member, Andhra Pradesh State Remote Sensing Applications Centre Society
 1989–1998: Member, Governing Body of Centre for Earth Science Studies, Trivandrum
 1988–1998: Member, Advisory Committee for Remote Sensing Applications Centre, Madhya Pradesh, Bhopal
 1988–1991: Member-Secretary, Indian National Committee for Space Research
 1985–1988: Member, Governing Council, Indian Institute of Astrophysics, Bangalore

Special Responsibilities/Assignments (Indian Space Research Organization) 
 2017–2019: Chairman Advisory Committee on Space Science
 2010: Member Committee to Review the Chandayaan-2Payload Proposals
 2005–2017: Vice-chairman, Advisory Committee on Space Science
 2004–2008: Chairman, Science Advisory Board, Chandrayaan-1
 2004–2015: Chairman, ASTROSAT Payload Monitoring Committee
 2009–2018: Chairman, Scientific Advisory Committee, Space Physics Laboratory, Trivandrum
 2003–2018: Chairman, Scientific Advisory Committee, National Atmospheric Research Laboratory, Tirupati
 2000–2002: Chairman, Lunar Mission Study Task Force
 1998–2001: Chairman, Technical Review Committee for Remote Sensing Applications
 1997–1998: Chairman, Management Council, Remote Sensing Application Missions
 1995–1998: Member, INSAT Project Management Council
 1992–1998: Member, Management Council for Laboratory for Electro-Optics Systems
 1992–1998: Member, Mission Management Council for Integrated Mission for Sustainable Development
 1989–1998: Member, Project Management Council, Indian Remote Sensing Satellite
 1988–1997: Alternate Chairman, Management Council, Remote Sensing Application Missions
 1988–1998: Chairman, Steering Committee for Remote Sensing Applications of Agriculture Mission
 1987–1990: Director, Indian Remote Sensing Satellite Utilisation Programme
 1987–1988: Member, Executive Committee, Microwave Remote Sensing Programme
 1987–1988: Member, Remote Sensing Application Mission Council
 1984–1992: Associate Project Director, (Very High Resolution Radiometer, Payload), INSAT-II Test Spacecraft Project
 1980–1988: Associate Project Director (Payloads), Indian Remote Sensing Satellite Project
 1975–1985: Principal scientistSEO/ Bhaskara TV payload

Professional bodies
 Fellow Indian Academy of Sciences
 Fellow National Academy of Sciences, India
 Fellow Indian National Academy of Engineering
 Fellow Indian Geophysical Union
 Fellow Gujarat Science Academy
 Fellow Indian Meteorological Society
 Fellow Indian Society of Remote Sensing
 Fellow Astronautical Society of India

Recognition
 Padma Bhushan (1999)
 Tata Institute of Fundamental Research Alumni Association Excellence Awards (2009)
 Outstanding Life Time Contribution in Ocean Science and Technology (2009)
 Life Time Achievement Award, Geospatial Technologies (2008)
 Outstanding Achievement Award, Indian Space Research Organization (2008)
 Aryabhata Award, Astronautical Society of India (2007)
 Melpadom Attumalil Georgekutty Merit Award, Mar Thoma church (2006)
 Bhaskara Award : Lifetime Contribution Awarded Instituted by Indian Society of Remote Sensing for outstanding achievement (1997)
 Om Prakash Bhasin Award for Science and Technology in the discipline of Space and Aerospace (1987)
 SICO – National Academy of Sciences Award for Instrumentation (1986)

Publications
 Fundamentals of Remote Sensing, University Press (India), 1st edition, 2003, 2nd edition 2005
 Building Earth Observation Cameras, CRC Press, 2015
 India's Journey Towards Excellence in Building – Earth Observation Cameras, re-published by Notion Press 2016
 Fundamentals of Remote Sensing, (with C. Jeganathan) University Press (India), 3rd edition, 2018

References

External links
Personal Website
 
 
 
 

1938 births
Living people
Recipients of the Padma Bhushan in science & engineering
20th-century Indian physicists
Indian Space Research Organisation people
Indian space scientists
Remote sensing professionals
People from Alappuzha district
Fellows of the Indian Academy of Sciences
Scientists from Kerala
Malayali people
University College Thiruvananthapuram alumni
Fellows of The National Academy of Sciences, India
Fellows of the Indian National Academy of Engineering